The Jewish Cultural Center in Ljubljana was founded in 2013. It is the center of Jewish life and culture in modern-day Slovenia. It was founded by activists with the original aim of promoting and practicing Jewish culture, establishing a museum and a place for prayer, and promoting cultural cooperation between Jews in Slovenia, the diaspora, and Israel. It quickly grabbed the eye of tourists and local authorities. It blends topics of Judaism and history through art, innovation, and creativity. Usual activities of Jewish communities are expanded upon, to include more entertaining, and educational topics through theater and puppet performances, concerts, lectures, large events for Jewish holidays, and other social gatherings. The Jewish Center is home to the first Jewish museum in Slovenia, as well as the first functioning synagogue since the Maribor Synagogue shut down. Ljubljana's Mini teater is the most important partner in the implementation of these programs. Its premises are intended for permanent public events and programs (puppet and theatre performances, concerts, literary evenings, exhibitions, lectures, Holocaust education programs, book promotions, Hebrew courses, meetings, socializing, film screenings, and discussions).

Foundation 
At the initiative of members of the Slovenian Jewish community and supporters of Jewish culture, Robert Waltl and a group of individuals in Ljubljana founded the Jewish Cultural Center. The aim was to promote and practice Jewish culture, establish a museum and a place for prayer, as well as to promote cultural cooperation between the Jews in Slovenia, the diaspora, and Israel. The Mini Theatre is the most important partner in the implementation of these programs. Its premises are intended for permanent public events and programs (puppet and theatre performances, concerts, literary evenings, exhibitions, lectures, Holocaust education programs, book promotions, Hebrew courses, meetings, socializing, film screenings, and discussions).

The most notable events are the annual House of Tolerance Festival, the public celebration of Hanukkah every year, commemorative events marking the World Holocaust Remembrance Day, where Robert Waltl reads all the names of Slovenian victims of the Holocaust, and the celebration of Jewish holidays. The center also serves as an educational institution, where educational mornings and lectures are held, for young people and adults teaching about Jewish culture and the Holocaust.

Projects

Stolpersteine 

On the initiative of Robert Waltl and the Jewish Center, a project has been underway in Ljubljana for five years, to lay stumbling blocks and investigate the fate of Ljubljana's Jews and Jewish refugees during the Holocaust, who fled to Ljubljana in the 1930s and more intensively after the occupation in 1941, as Ljubljana was considered a safe haven until the capitulation of Italy in September 1943.

In Slovenia, the project is managed by Robert Waltl and the Jewish Center Ljubljana in cooperation with the Maribor Synagogue Centre for Jewish Cultural Heritage. The first stumbling block was laid in Ljubljana on 6 August 2018 on Cankar's Embankment. To date, 68 stumbling blocks have been laid in the Slovenian capital in 24 locations. Additionally, homage has also been paid to the victims of the Holocaust in Murska Sobota and Lendava. Robert Waltl managed to convince the mayors of these cities to join the project and co-finance it. The mayor of Ljubljana, Zoran Janković, is the honorary sponsor of the laying of stumbling blocks in Ljubljana, and, the president of Slovenia, Mr. Borut Pahor, became the honorary patron of the laying of stumbling blocks in Slovenia.

Stumbling blocks, or Stolpersteine, are an art project in which the artist Gunter Demnig paid homage to the victims of the Nazi regime by placing brass cubes on the pavements in front of the house numbers where the last free Jews lived. The project is in step with European efforts to preserve the historical memory of all the victims of National Socialism between 1933 and 1945 and of the greatest genocide in human history – the Holocaust.

The House of Tolerance Festival 

The House of Tolerance Festival in Ljubljana is an important public platform, where participants have been remembering the horrors of the Holocaust and drawing attention to modern forms of intolerance and hatred since 2015. The festival was founded under the leadership of the festival president, Branko Lustig, a two-time Academy Awards winner, and a Holocaust survivor, co-founded this festival of tolerance in Ljubljana with Robert Waltl and the Jewish Center. This event has found its partners and followers, amongst activists who wish to propagate the idea of tolerance, a society of equality, and an understanding of diversity as the foundations of society. The festival is a regional franchise, being held every year in Zagreb, Rijeka, Maribor, Belgrade, Vienna, Sarajevo, Cetinje, and Ljubljana

The festival founder highlighted that the main aim is to remember so that we would never again allow sinister and inhuman events such as the Holocaust to happen. The main topic of the programs is the Holocaust and various types of intolerance, draw attention on the need to fight antisemitism and other forms of discrimination. The festival program addresses these topics and constantly draws the public's attention to them. 

After four years of operation, the festival suffered a great loss with the death of Branko Lustig, so Waltl continued to work with film connoisseurs such as Dr. Frank Stern from Vienna and Dragan Rubeša from Croatia.

References 

Jews and Judaism in Slovenia
Synagogues in Slovenia
Buildings and structures in Ljubljana
2013 establishments in Slovenia
Museums in Ljubljana